Stoa Basileios ( or τοῦ βασιλέως), meaning Royal Stoa, was a stoa constructed in Ancient Athens in the 6th century BC and substantially altered in the 5th century BC. It was located in the northwest corner (known as "the Herms" because of the great number of Hermae set up there) of the Athenian Agora.

The stoa was built in the Doric order and it measures 18 by 7.5 meters. Its facade carries a plain Doric frieze. Its Doric exterior includes 8 columns, while its interior space includes four columns. The modifications of the fifth century BC add two small porches to the archaic structure. 

The Royal Stoa was the headquarters of the King Archon and of the Areopagos council (in charge of religious affairs and crime). A statue of Themis (representing Justice) stood in front of the building. Copies of some of the city laws were kept in the Stoa.

The front of the building was where Socrates met Euthyphro and had the conversation which Plato recreated in his Euthyphro. It was where Socrates was formally charged with impiety by Meletus. Historians believe that the voting for ostracism, a political practice in Athens during the 5th century BC, may have taken place in front of the Royal Stoa.

References

External links
 Agathe.gr: the Royal Stoa

Buildings and structures completed in the 5th century BC
Ancient Greek buildings and structures in Athens
Former buildings and structures in Greece
Ancient Agora of Athens
Basileios